The Bathynias was a river of ancient Thrace that emptied itself into the Propontis not far from Byzantium. This river is probably the same as the one called Bathyrsus by Theophanes, and Bithyas by Appian.

References

Ancient Greek geography
History of Istanbul Province
Rivers of Turkey
Thrace